Go is an American television series for children that aired late-mornings on Saturdays on NBC between September 1973 and September 1976.  It had the shortest title for a TV series until V debuted in 1984 on the same network.

The first two seasons of Go explored various action-oriented occupations, showing what it's like to be a race car driver, a symphony conductor, or a bronco buster. For the third season, the emphasis shifted to the United States Bicentennial observance of 1976, therefore Go became Go-U.S.A. from September 6, 1975 until the series ended the following year.

References

1970s American children's television series
1973 American television series debuts
1976 American television series endings
NBC original programming
Peabody Award-winning television programs